Yan Ting (born 3 May 1997) is a Chinese freestyle skier who competes internationally.
 
She participated at the 2018 Winter Olympics.

References

1997 births
Living people
Chinese female freestyle skiers 
Olympic freestyle skiers of China 
Freestyle skiers at the 2018 Winter Olympics 
People from Heihe
Sportspeople from Heilongjiang
21st-century Chinese women